Tiruchirappalli Bicycle Share is a new proposed bicycle sharing system for the city of Tiruchirappalli.

Background 
In November 2013, the two-day conference on "Sustainable Cities Through Transport" at Coimbatore, with respective city engineers from Madurai, Tiruchi, Tirupur, Salem and Coimbatore, stressed for improving non–motorised transport in city corporations and town municipalities and also chalked out plans for creation of transit systems, pedestrian pathways, cycling tracks, parks, pedestrian zones, etc.

The plan was developed in association with Institute for Transportation and Development Policy (ITDP) and International Council for Local Environmental Initiatives (ICLEI) is being funded by Ministry of Urban Development would create exclusive bicycle lanes with 66 "cycle sharing stations", besides improving the city's road infrastructure and future transport modes, which presently has narrow roads and indiscriminate encroachments coupled with booming vehicle population.

As of December 2019, the Trichy City Corporation has dropped its bicycle sharing project.

See also 
 List of bicycle sharing systems
 Utility cycling
 Human-powered transport

References

Further reading

External links
 Tiruchirappalli City Municipal Corporation - Official Website

Bicycle Share
Proposed public transport in India
Community bicycle programs
Utility cycling
Cycling in India
Proposed infrastructure in Tamil Nadu
Bicycle sharing in India